Heracleium or Herakleion was a town of Bithynia, on the Propontis.

Its site is located near modern Ereğli, Asiatic Turkey.

References

Populated places in Bithynia
Former populated places in Turkey
History of Kocaeli Province